The 1979 Newfoundland general election was held on June 18, 1979 to elect members of the 38th General Assembly of Newfoundland. It was won by the Progressive Conservative party.

Results

Members elected
For complete electoral history, see individual districts

References
 Election Report

Further reading
 

Elections in Newfoundland and Labrador
1979 elections in Canada
1979 in Newfoundland and Labrador
June 1979 events in Canada